The 2012 Fórmula Truck season was the 17th Fórmula Truck season. It began on March 4 at Velopark, and ended on December 9 at Brasília after ten rounds. All ten rounds counted towards the Brazilian title, with four rounds counting towards the South American title.

Mercedes-Benz driver Leandro Totti won the South American and Brazilian Championship.

Teams and drivers
All drivers were Brazilian-registered, excepting Luis Pucci, who raced under Argentine racing license.

Notes

Calendar
All races were held in Brazil, excepting round at Autódromo Oscar Cabalén, that was held in Argentina.

Key:

Results

Championship standings
Points were awarded as follows:

Brazilian

Drivers' standings

Notes:
1 2 3 4 5 refers to the classification of the drivers on the yellow flag scheduled, where bonus points are awarded 5–4–3–2–1 and the top five drivers in race ensures a place on the podium.

Manufacturers' standings

South American

Drivers' standings

Notes:
1 2 3 4 5 refers to the classification of the drivers on the yellow flag scheduled, where bonus points are awarded 5–4–3–2–1 and the top five drivers in race ensures a place on the podium.

Manufacturers' standings

References

External links
 Official website of the Fórmula Truck (in Portuguese)

Formula Truck
Fórmula Truck seasons